Tisbidae is a family of copepods belonging to the order Harpacticoida.

Genera:
 Amplipedicola Avdeev, 2010
 Aspinothorax Moura & Martínez Arbizu, 2004
 Avdeevia Bresciani & Lützen, 1994
 Bathyidia Farran, 1926
 Brescianiana Avdeev, 1982
 Cholidya Farran, 1914
 Cholidyella Avdeev, 1982
 Drescheriella Dahms & Dieckmann, 1987
 Genesis Lopez-González, Bresciani & Huys, 2000
 Idyanthopsis Bocquet & Bozic, 1955
 Neotisbella Boxshall, 1979
 Octopinella Avdeev, 1986
 Paraidya Huys, 2009
 Sacodiscus Wilson, 1924
 Scutellidium Claus, 1866
 Tachidiella Sars, 1911
 Tachydiopsis Sars, 1911
 Tisbe Lilljeborg, 1853
 Tisbella Gurney, 1927
 Tisbintra Sewell, 1940
 Tripartisoma Avdeev, 1983
 Volkmannia Boxshall, 1979
 Vulcanoctopusi López-González, Bresciani, Huys, González, Guerra & Pascual, 2000
 Yunona Avdeev, 1983

References

Copepods